Gary Atkins (born 12 October 1966) is a former professional rugby league footballer who played in the 1980s, 1990s and 2000s.

Playing career

County Cup Final appearances
Gary Atkins played , (replaced by interchange/substitute Keith England) and scored a try in Castleford's 11-8 victory over Wakefield Trinity in the 1990 Yorkshire County Cup Final during the 1990–91 season at Elland Road, Leeds on Sunday 23 September 1990.

Club career
Gary Atkins was transferred from York to Castleford on Wednesday 1 August 1990, and made his début for Castleford in the 12-30 defeat by Warrington on Sunday 9 September 1990.

Coaching

References

External links
Memory Box Search at archive.castigersheritage.com

1966 births
Living people
Castleford Tigers players
English rugby league coaches
English rugby league players
Hull Kingston Rovers players
Place of birth missing (living people)
Rugby league centres
Rugby league five-eighths
Rugby league halfbacks
York Wasps coaches
York Wasps players